Harlingen may mean:

 Harlingen, Netherlands, a municipality and city in the province of Friesland in the Netherlands
 Harlingen, Texas, a city in the United States
 Harlingen, New Jersey, an unincorporated village in Montgomery Township, New Jersey, United States